Higashinosawa Dam  is a gravity dam located in Hokkaido Prefecture in Japan. The dam is used for power production. The catchment area of the dam is 155.1 km2. The dam impounds about 56  ha of land when full and can store 9560 thousand cubic meters of water. The construction of the dam was started on 1982 and completed in 1987.

References

Dams in Hokkaido